The 2007 Houston elections took place on May 12, June 16, and November 6, 2007. All City Council posts, the City Controller, and the Mayor all had elections. All positions were non-partisan.

Mayor 
See 2007 Houston mayoral election

City Controller 

The 2007 Houston City Controller election was a non disputed election with Incumbent Annise Parker being re-elected to a third term with virtually 100% of the vote.

City Council At-large 1 

In the 2007 Houston City Council At-large 1 election, Peter Hoyt Brown was re-elected to a second term with 100% of the vote.

City Council At-large 2 

In the 2007 Houston City Council At-large 2 election, Sue Lovell was re-elected to a second term against opponent Michael Griffin (Not the former administrator of NASA).

City Council At-large 3 

2007 was a rough year for At-large 3, First in May many candidates dove into a crowded special election, the top two, Melissa Noriega and Roy Morales, then ran in the run-off in June. Noriega won but later faced Morales again in November and was again successful.

City Council At-large 4 

In the 2007 Houston City Council At-large 4 election, Ronald Green, was re-elected to a third term. He was given 100% of the vote from the voters.

City Council At-large 5 

In the 2007 Houston City Council At-large 5 election, Jolanda Jones was elected to an at-large position, after a run-off.

City Council District A 

In the 2007 Houston City Council District A election, Toni Lawrence was re-elected to a third term with 100% of the vote.

City Council District B 

In the 2007 Houston City Council District B election, Jarvis Johnson was re-elected to a second term.

City Council District C 

In the 2007 Houston City Council District C election, Anne Clutterbuck was re-elected to a second term.

City Council District D 

In the 2007 Houston City Council District D election, Wanda Adams was elected after a run-off.

City Council District E 

In the Houston City Council District E election, Mike Sullivan was elected after a run-off.

City Council District F 

In the 2007 Houston City Council District F election, M. J. Khan was elected to a third term with 100% of the vote.

City Council District G 

In the 2007 Houston City Council District G election, Pam Holm was elected to a third term with 100% of the vote.

City Council District H 

In the 2007 Houston City Council District H election, Adrian Garcia was elected to a third term with 100% of the vote. He resigned one year into his term to become the Harris County Sheriff.

City Council District I 

In the 2007 Houston City Council District I election, James Rodriguez was elected as a new council member.

mayoral election
Houston
Non-partisan elections